The Kuching District is an administrative district within Kuching Division, Sarawak, Malaysia. It is subdivided into two subdistricts which is Kuching Proper and Padawan. The population of the entire District was 617,887 at the 2010 Census.

Kuching Proper subdistrict 
The Kuching Proper subdistrict is divided into two areas:
 the urban area, more commonly known as Kuching City.
 the suburbs and rural areas, collectively known as the Padawan municipality, formerly known as the Kuching Rural District. The headquarters is situated in Kota Padawan (formerly named 10th Mile Bazaar).

Padawan subdistrict 

Padawan was proclaimed as a subdistrict on 11 August 1983 and is headquartered in Teng Bukap.

External links 
 Kuching District Office